Inositol monophosphatase 1 is an enzyme that in humans is encoded by the IMPA1 gene.

Interacting partners 

IMPA1 has been shown to interact with Bergmann glial S100B and calbindin.

Chemical inhibitors 

L-690,330 is a competitive inhibitor of IMPase activity with very good activity in vitro however with limited bioavailability in vivo. Due to its increased specificity compared to Lithium, L-690,330 has been used extensively in characterizing the results of IMPase inhibition in various cell culture models. L-690,488, a prodrug or L-690,330, has also been developed which has greater cell permeability. Treatment of cortical slices with L-690,488 resulted in accumulation of inositol demonstrating the activity of this inhibitor in tissue.

Inhibition of IMPA1 activity can have pleiotropic effects on cellular function, including altering phosphoinositide signalling, autophagy, apoptosis, and other effects.

Bipolar disorder 

Initially it was noticed that several drugs useful in treatment of bipolar disorder such as lithium, carbamazepine and valproic acid had a common mechanism of action on enzymes in the phosphatidylinositol signalling pathway and the inositol depletion hypothesis for the pathophysiology of bipolar disorder was suggested. Intensive research has so far not confirmed this hypothesis, partly because lithium can also act on a number of other enzymes in this pathway, complicating results from in vitro studies.

References

Further reading

External links 
 PDBe-KB provides an overview of all the structure information available in the PDB for Human Inositol monophosphatase 1

Biology of bipolar disorder
EC 3.1.3